Héctor Padilla Gutiérrez (born 20 August 1949) is a Mexican politician from the Institutional Revolutionary Party. From 2006 to 2009 he served as Deputy of the LX Legislature of the Mexican Congress representing Jalisco.

References

1949 births
Living people
Politicians from Jalisco
Institutional Revolutionary Party politicians
21st-century Mexican politicians
Deputies of the LX Legislature of Mexico
Members of the Chamber of Deputies (Mexico) for Jalisco